The 1953 Arizona Wildcats football team represented the University of Arizona during the 1953 college football season.

Schedule

 The game versus Arizona State was first game on television.

Awards
 All-Border (First Team): B Kenny Cardella, T Buddy Lewis

References

Arizona
Arizona Wildcats football seasons
Arizona Wildcats football